The 1993 Lipton Championships was a tennis tournament played on Hard courts in Key Biscayne, Florida, United States. The event was part of the 1993 ATP Tour and 1993 WTA Tour. The tournament was held from 12 to 21 March 1993.

Arantxa Sánchez Vicario and Larisa Neiland were the defending champions, but Sánchez Vicario did not compete this year

Neiland teamed up with Jana Novotná and won the title, by defeating Jill Hetherington and Kathy Rinaldi 6–2, 7–5 in the final.

Seeds
All seeds received a bye into the second round.

Draw

Finals

Top half

Section 1

Section 2

Bottom half

Section 3

Section 4

References

External links
 Official results archive (ITF)
 Official results archive (WTA)

Women's Doubles
1993 WTA Tour